Ciampa may refer to:

People with the surname
Emilius R. Ciampa (1896–1996), American sculptor born in Italy
Gino Ciampa (born 1962), Australian judoka
John Ciampa (1922–1984), Italian-American stuntman
Letizia Ciampa (born 1986), Italian voice actress
Tommaso Ciampa (born 1985), American professional wrestler

Biology
Ciampa (moth), a genus of moths in the family Geometridae

Italian-language surnames